Morgan Langley may refer to:

 Morgan Langley (producer) (born 1974), American television producer
 Morgan Langley (soccer) (born 1989), American soccer player